Boris Khazanov (16 January 1928 – 11 January 2022) was a Russian writer.

Biography
Khazanov earned a degree in philology from Moscow State University. From 1949 to 1955, he was sentenced to penal labor for anti-Sovietism. After his release, he became a doctor and began writing books. In 1982, he moved to Munich, and from 1983 to 1993, worked for Radio Free Europe. In addition to writing, he translated the works of philosopher Gottfried Wilhelm Leibniz into Russian.

Boris Khazanov died in Munich on 11 January 2022 at the age of 93.

Publications
Mythos Russland: Betrachtungen aus deutscher Zuflucht (1986)
Gegenzeit (1986)
Die Königsstunde (1990)
Unten ist Himmel (1993)
Der Zauberlehrer (1996)
Vögel über Moskau (1998)

References

1928 births
2022 deaths
Writers from Saint Petersburg
Soviet writers